Occipital crest may refer to:

 External occipital crest
 Internal occipital crest